La Menace is a 1977 French-Canadian film directed by Alain Corneau and starring Yves Montand, Carole Laure and Marie Dubois.

Plot 
Henri Savin has managed a trucking company for his lover, Dominique Montlaur, for many years. Now he is planning to leave her for Julie Manet, the woman he has made pregnant, and Dominique is hysterical. She first threatens suicide, then shows up at a meeting of Henri and Julie. Dominique tries everything she can think of to break Henri and Julie apart, to no avail. Frustrated in her efforts, she jumps off a cliff and dies. Savin insists that he and Julie lie to the police about the encounter, although Dominique's death was a suicide and therefore they had no direct hand in it. Detective Waldeck investigates Dominique's death.

Cast 
Yves Montand - Henri Savin
Carole Laure - Julie Manet
Marie Dubois - Dominique Montlaur
Jean-François Balmer - Waldeck
Marc Eyraud -  Judge
Roger Muni - Bruno
Jacques Rispal - Paco
Michel Ruhl - Master Leverrier
Gabriel Gascon - Pannequin
Martin Trévières - Belloc

Film location
The last section of the movie was shot in the Canadian province of British Columbia; in the Cariboo region, Cypress Mountain and North Vancouver.

Budget
estimated 2,400,000 CAD

Awards
Marie Dubois won César for Best Supporting Actress in 1978.

References

External links 

1970s Canadian films
1970s French films
1970s psychological thriller films
1977 films
Canadian psychological thriller films
Films about suicide
Films directed by Alain Corneau
Films scored by Gerry Mulligan
Films shot in Vancouver
French-language Canadian films
French psychological thriller films
Trucker films